"One of Us Is Gonna Die Young" is a song written by Ola Salo and recorded on the Ark's 2004 studio album, State of The Ark. It was released as a single in the same year, peaking at 4th position at the Swedish singles chart.

The song also charted at Trackslistan. Charting at Svensktoppen, it stayed on the chart for 9 weeks between 9 January and 27 February 2005, peaking at 6th position.

Charts

Weekly charts

Year-end charts

References

2004 singles
2004 songs
The Ark (Swedish band) songs
Songs written by Ola Salo
English-language Swedish songs
EMI Records singles